St Andrew Boat Club is alongside Meggetland Sports Complex, at Meggetland, on the Union Canal, in the city of Edinburgh, Scotland.

SABC is affiliated to Scottish Rowing, the national governing body for rowing in Scotland.



History

The club was founded in 1846.

George Ogilvie of Holefield farm via Kelso, Scotland – father of Scottish Border poet and Australian bush balladeer Will H. Ogilvie (1869–1963) – was one of the inaugural members, and in 1904 was at his death the club's oldest member.

Training 

Training on the water usually takes place on a 1600m stretch of the Union Canal during the week. At weekends regular training sessions take place at Auchinstarry, the River Clyde in Glasgow or Strathclyde Country Park, Scotland's Olympic standard regatta course.

Land sessions take place across the road from the boat club, at Energy Gym.

Squads 
 Beginners and Novices
 Juniors (J13 - J18)
 Senior Men
 Senior Women
 Masters (Aged 27+)

Silver Rudder 
The Silver Rudder is the annual boat race between St Andrew Boat Club and Clyde Amateur Rowing Club (Glasgow), and takes place on the River Clyde in Glasgow.

Honours

British champions

See also 
Scottish Rowing
British Rowing

References

External links 
 St Andrew Boat Club | Scotland's Oldest Open Rowing Club

1846 establishments in Scotland
Sports clubs established in 1846
Sports teams in Edinburgh
Rowing clubs in Scotland